Lozère is a landlocked department in the region of Occitanie in Southern France, located near the Massif Central, bounded to the northeast by Haute-Loire, to the east by Ardèche, to the south by Gard, to the west by Aveyron, and the northwest by Cantal. It is named after Mont Lozère. With 76,604 inhabitants as of 2019, Lozère is the least populous French department.

History
Lozère was created in 1790 during the French Revolution, when the whole of France was divided into departments, replacing the old provinces. Lozère was formed from part of the old province of Languedoc.

Pliny's Natural History praised the cheese of Lozère:
The kinds of cheese that are most esteemed at Rome, where the various good things of all nations are to be judged of by comparison, are those that come from the provinces of Nemausus, and more especially the area there of Lesura and Gabalis (Lozère and Gévaudan); but its excellence is only very short-lived, and it must be eaten while it is fresh.

During the period 1764–67, the Beast of Gévaudan, a creature believed to be a wolf, terrorized the general area in the Margeride Mountains of the former province of Gévaudan (nearly identical with the modern Lozère department).

Geography
It is the northernmost department of the current Occitanie region and is surrounded by five departments belonging to two regions: Cantal, Haute-Loire and Ardèche departments of the Auvergne-Rhône-Alpes region, and Gard and Aveyron departments of the Occitanie region.

The geography of Lozère is complicated, covering four mountain ranges. The climate here is also cold, but drier than in Aubrac, with less snow.

The department also contains numerous rivers, above and below ground, including the Tarn, whose source is on Mont Lozère, and which flows through the Gorges du Tarn in the Causses.

Demographics
Population development since 1801:

Lozère is a least populated French department. It has a population, in 2019, of 76,604, for a population density of  inhabitants/km2. The department boasts a population similar in size to that of the country Andorra. The inhabitants of Lozère are known, in French, as Lozériens and Lozériennes.

Principal towns

The most populous commune is Mende, the prefecture. As of 2019, there are 3 communes with more than 3,000 inhabitants:

Administration
The département is managed by the Departmental Council of Lozère in Mende. , the President of the council is Sophie Pantel. Lozère is part of the region of Occitanie.

Administrative divisions
There are 2 arrondissements, 13 cantons and 152 communes in Lozère.

The following is a list of the 13 cantons of the Lozère department (with their INSEE codes), following the French canton reorganisation which came into effect in March 2015:

 Bourgs sur Colagne (4803)
 La Canourgue (4802)
 Le Collet-de-Dèze (4804)
 Florac Trois Rivières (4805)
 Grandrieu (4806)
 Langogne (4807)
 Marvejols (4808)
 Mende-1 (4809)
 Mende-2 (4810)
 Peyre en Aubrac (4801)
 Saint-Alban-sur-Limagnole (4811)
 Saint-Chély-d'Apcher (4812)
 Saint-Étienne-du-Valdonnez (4813)

Economy
The main activities are cattle farming and tourism. There is barely any arable farming in Lozère due to poor soil quality. The hardy Aubrac is the most commonly farmed cattle breed here.

The region has one of the lowest rates of unemployment in France, which may be attributed to the enforced long-standing tradition whereby young people emigrate to cities such as Lyon, Marseille, Montpellier when they reach working age.

Land use

Lozère is a rural department, with relatively little land taken up by roads and buildings.   Overall the land use is divided as follows:
  Forest    43.81%
  Heath & other open land   31.19%
  Arable land    12.74%
  Fields       11.36%
  Roads and buildings 0.54%
  Rivers and ponds   0.3

Politics

Current National Assembly Representative

Tourism
Tourist activities include caving and a variety of sports, such as skiing and kayaking. Lozère contains a part of the Cévennes National Park. Lozère is considered one of the best areas in France for trout fishing. Rivers such as the Lot, Tarn and Truyère are particularly noted for their trout populations.

See also
 Arrondissements of the Lozère department
 Cantons of the Lozère department
 Communes of the Lozère department

Explanatory notes

References

External links

 Departmental Council of Lozère 
 Prefecture website 
  Comité Départemental du Tourisme en Lozère 
 

 
1790 establishments in France
Departments of Occitania (administrative region)
Massif Central
States and territories established in 1790